Kelvin Martin Tatum MBE (born 8 February 1964, in Epsom, Surrey) is a former British international motorcycle speedway and grasstrack rider.

Career
Tatum attended Brighton College from 1977 to 1980. He started riding speedway bikes at Hackney's training school at Hackney Wick Stadium in the winter of 1982-83. He was given his first team place at Hackney's London rivals, Wimbledon Dons, riding in the top flight British League in 1983. He finished the season with an average of over six points per meeting.

In 1985 he signed for Coventry Bees, staying there for the next six seasons. Stints then followed at Berwick Bandits, Bradford Dukes, Arena Essex Hammers, Poole Pirates, Peterborough Panthers and the ill-fated London Lions, with brother Neville Tatum among his teammates.

Tatum became British Champion twice; in 1987 and 1990. In 1990 Tatum was the highest placed British rider in the World Final at the Odsal Stadium in Bradford, finishing in 7th place with 9 points from his 5 rides. In the 1990 World Final qualifying rounds, Tatum had won the Commonwealth Final at the Belle Vue Stadium in Manchester. It was his third Commonwealth Final win after having done so in 1987 and 1988. Tatum would add a fourth Commonwealth crown to his trophy cabinet in 1992.

Longtrack and grasstrack
Later in Tatum's career, he turned his attention to grasstrack and longtrack to much success. He won the World Long Track Championship three times, in 1995, 1998 and 2000, and missed out on a fourth title in 2004 when his bike broke down whilst leading the final. Tatum was also the European Grasstrack Champion in 1995 and British Grasstrack Champion four times: in 1996, 1999, 2000 and jointly in 2001, and was almost unbeatable in domestic grasstrack events in the latter stage of his career, winning 4 British Masters Championships. Fittingly, Tatum won his last grasstrack event, the Bonfire Burnup in 2006 at Collier Street in Kent.

Kelvin Tatum also won the Australian Long track Grand Prix in 1991 at the  Bathurst Showground, and again in 1999 at the Tamworth Showground.

After retirement
Kelvin is now a television presenter, appearing on BT Sport speedway programmes as a presenter and commentator and is currently the lead expert commentator for Speedway Grand Prix and Speedway World Cup broadcasts. He began commentating when taking a break from the sport, but continued when he returned to ride for the Arena Essex Hammers in 2002. He was awarded an MBE in the 2003 New Year Honours list.

World Final appearances

Individual World Championship
 1985 -  Bradford, Odsal Stadium - 8th - 8pts
 1986 -  Chorzów, Silesian Stadium - 3rd - 12pts
 1988 -  Vojens, Speedway Center - 8th - 8pts
 1989 -  Munich, Olympic Stadium - 5th - 10pts
 1990 -  Bradford, Odsal Stadium - 7th - 9pts
 1991 -  Göteborg, Ullevi - 8th - 8pts
 1992 -  Wrocław, Olympic Stadium - 10th - 6pts

World Pairs Championship
 1985 -  Rybnik, Rybnik Municipal Stadium (with Kenny Carter) - 2nd - 27pts (13)
 1987 -  Pardubice, Svítkov Stadion (with Simon Wigg) - 2nd - 44pts (24)
 1988 -  Bradford, Odsal Stadium (with Simon Cross) - 2nd - 41pts (21)
 1989 -  Leszno, Alfred Smoczyk Stadium (with Paul Thorp) - 3rd - 37pts (21)
 1990 -  Landshut, Ellermühle Stadium (with Simon Cross) - 8th - 20pts (20)
 1992 -  Lonigo, Pista Speedway (with Gary Havelock / Martin Dugard) - 2nd - 23+2pts (8)

World Team Cup
 1985 -  Long Beach, Veterans Memorial Stadium (with Jeremy Doncaster / Phil Collins / Richard Knight / John Davis) – 3rd – 13pts (3)
 1986 -  Göteborg, Ullevi,  Vojens, Speedway Center and  Bradford, Odsal Stadium (with Simon Wigg / Neil Evitts / Jeremy Doncaster / Chris Morton / Marvyn Cox) - 3rd - 81pts (19)
 1987 -  Fredericia, Fredericia Speedway,  Coventry, Brandon Stadium and  Prague, Marketa Stadium (with Simon Wigg / Jeremy Doncaster / Simon Cross / Marvyn Cox) - 2nd - 101pts (25)
 1988 -  Long Beach, Veterans Memorial Stadium (with Simon Wigg / Simon Cross / Chris Morton / Gary Havelock) - 4th - 22pts (7)
 1989 -  Bradford, Odsal Stadium (with Jeremy Doncaster / Paul Thorp / Simon Wigg / Simon Cross) - Winner - 48pts (12)
 1990 -  Pardubice, Svítkov Stadion - 2nd - 34pts (11)
 1992 -  Kumla, Kumla Speedway - 3rd - 31pts (3)
 1993 -  Coventry, Brandon Stadium - 4th - 14pts (2)

British Speedway Championship

Finals

 1985  @ Coventry (4th) 12pts
 1986  @ Coventry (6th) 8pts
 1987  @ Coventry (Champion) 13pts
 1988  @ Coventry (Runner-up) 13pts
 1989  @ Coventry (Runner-up) 12pts
 1990  @  Coventry (Champion) 13pts
 1991  @  Coventry (Runner-up) 13pts
 1992  @  Coventry (5th) 10pts
 1994  @  Coventry (11th) 6pts
 1996  @  Coventry (4th) 10pts
 1997  @  Coventry (8th) 8pts
 1998  @  Coventry (6th) 9pts

World Longtrack Championship

Finals

 1994 -  Marianske Lazne(11th) 9pts
 1995 -  Scheeßel (Champion) 20pts * Note Tatum beat Simon Wigg in a run-off for the championship
 1996 -  Herxheim (5th) 14pts

Grand-Prix

 1998 - 5 apps (Champion) 104pts
 1999 - 5 apps (Third) 79pts
 2000 - 5 apps (Champion) 102pts
 2001 - 4 apps (Second) 76pts
 2002 - 5 apps (Second) 96pts
 2003 - 6 apps (Second) 120pts
 2004 - 5 apps (Second) 101pts
 2005 - 2 apps (11th) 34pts

World Longtrack Best Grand-Prix Results

  - Abingdon First 1998
  - Aduard First 1998
  - Berghaupten Third  1999
  - Bielefeld First 2002, Second  2003
  - Saint-Colomb-de-Lauzun Second 2002
  - Eenrum First 1999, 2000
  - Harswinkel First 2000
  - Jubek First 2000, Second  1999
  - Marmande First 2003, 2004
  - Morizes First 2001, 2004, Second  2000, 2002, Third 2003
  - New Plymouth First 2003
  - Tonbridge First 2003, Third  2001
  - Pfarrkirchen First 2004
  - Parchim Second 2001, 2005
  - Scheeßel First 1998, Second  2002

European Grasstrack Championship

Finals

1995  - Joure (Champion) 24pts

2004  - Eenrum (Did not start)

British Masters Grasstrack Championship

Podium Finishes

1993  Third @ Tonbridge & Wimborne

1994  Third  @ Severn Valley & Tonbridge

1995  Second  @ North Berks & Severn Valley

1996  First  @ Andover & North Berks

1997  Second  @ Wainfleet & Andover

1999  First  @ North Berks

2000  First  @ Astra

2001  Equal First @ North Berks with Glenn Cunningham

2003  Third  @ Astra

External links
 http://grasstrackgb.co.uk/kelvin-tatum/

References

1964 births
Living people
British speedway riders
English motorcycle racers
British Speedway Championship winners
Members of the Order of the British Empire
English television presenters
Sports commentators
Coventry Bees riders
Lakeside Hammers riders
Poole Pirates riders
Berwick Bandits riders
Wimbledon Dons riders
Bradford Dukes riders
People educated at Brighton College
Sportspeople from Epsom